Servak or Seruk or Sarvak may refer to:
 Sarvak, Fars
 Servak, Kohgiluyeh and Boyer-Ahmad

See also
Tang-e Sarvak